Armend Alimi (born 11 December 1987) is a Macedonian professional footballer of Albanian origin who plays for Rabotnički and the Macedonia national team.

Career
His contract with Croatian club Istra 1961 was terminated by mutual consent in November 2011. Alimi also plays for the North Macedonia national football team.

He was the youngest captain of all time in Bashkimi. He debuted for the Macedonian senior national team in a World Cup qualifier in September 2009 against Norway in Oslo.

References

External links

Armend Alimi at MacedonianFootball 

1987 births
Living people
Albanian footballers from North Macedonia
Macedonian footballers
North Macedonia international footballers
NK Istra 1961 players
FK Bashkimi players
FK Milano Kumanovo players
Örebro SK players
Nea Salamis Famagusta FC players
Ermis Aradippou FC players
KF Shkëndija players
Croatian Football League players
Allsvenskan players
Cypriot First Division players
Macedonian expatriate footballers
Expatriate footballers in Croatia
Expatriate footballers in Sweden
Expatriate footballers in Cyprus
North Macedonia under-21 international footballers
Sportspeople from Kumanovo
Association football midfielders
Macedonian First Football League players